Il segreto di Susanna (English: Susanna's Secret, German: Susannens Geheimnis) is an intermezzo in one act by Ermanno Wolf-Ferrari to an Italian libretto by Enrico Golisciani. The premiere of the opera was in German, in a translation by Max Kalbeck, at the Hoftheater in Munich on 4 December 1909.

Roles

Synopsis

Time: Early 20th century
Place: A drawing room in Piedmont

Count Gil returns home suspecting that he has seen his wife, Susanna, walking alone in the street, something he had forbidden her to do after their wedding. He is relieved when he discovers that she is playing the piano in the living room. However, it was indeed the countess whom he had seen but she returned home shortly before her husband.

Gil's happiness is short-lived. The room smells of tobacco, and he is surprised since he does not smoke and neither does Susanna, nor the servant, Sante. Suddenly a horrible thought strikes him: is it possible that Susanna is unfaithful to him with a smoker? He speaks with his wife and is soon ashamed of having such suspicions. Gil wants to hug Susanna, but he notices that the tobacco smell comes from Susanna's clothes. She finally admits to having a secret, but does not want to tell him what it is. Gil becomes angry and starts to turn the house upside-down after she locks herself in her bedroom. Finally, as Gil is leaving the house to go to his club, she brings him his umbrella. He softens, they become reconciled, and he exits.

As soon as he leaves the house, she closes the door and opens the small packet she gave to Sante when she came home. She takes out a cigarette and the two smoke. That is her secret! But while she is smoking with Sante, Gil comes back. Smelling the tobacco he starts to search the house for Susanna's lover on the pretext of looking for the umbrella he forgot. Having no success, Gil furiously goes out again and Susanna lights a second cigarette. Once more Gil enters and, this time, he is sure that he will catch her in the act. Trying to seize her hand, he gets burned thus finally unveiling her secret. They forgive each other and swear eternal love while smoking together.

Recordings
 1952 – Ester Orel, Mario Borriello; Orchestra Sinfonica di Torino, Alfredo Simonetto – Cetra Records (LP), later licensed to Deutsche Grammophon
 1954 – , Giuseppe Valdengo; Italian Radio Symphony Orchestra Turin,  – Cetra Records
 1976 – Maria Chiara, Bernd Weikl; Orchestra of the Royal Opera House, Lamberto Gardelli – Decca (LP)
 1980 – Renata Scotto, Renato Bruson; Philharmonia Orchestra, John Pritchard – CBS (LP and CD)
 2008 – Dora Rodrigues, Marc Canturri, Royal Liverpool Philharmonic, Vasily Petrenko (conductor) – live in Liverpool, Avie Records, issued in cooperation with the European Commission

References

Sources

Further reading
 Warrack, John and West, Ewan (1992), The Oxford Dictionary of Opera, 782 pages,

External links

Operas by Ermanno Wolf-Ferrari
Operas set in Italy
Operas set in the 20th century
German-language operas
Italian-language operas
Operas
One-act operas
1909 operas
Smoking